The 2017 World Figure Skating Championships were held 29 March – 2 April 2017 in Helsinki, Finland. The host was named in June 2014. Medals were awarded in the disciplines of men's singles, ladies' singles, pairs, and ice dancing. The event also determined the number of entries for each country at the 2018 World Championships and the 2018 Winter Olympics.

Venues 

Hartwall Arena's main arena, with an ice surface measuring 60 m x 30 m, was used for all competitions and several practice sessions. The rest of the practice sessions took place at Hartwall Arena's practice rink (58 m x 28 m) and Pirkkola ice rink (for pairs, 60 m x 30 m). Hartwall Arena's main rink and practice rink facilities are in the same venue. Pirkkola practice rink is about four kilometres from Hartwall Arena.

Records

The following new ISU best scores were set during this competition:

Qualification

Minimum TES 
Participants were required to have attained minimum technical element scores at an earlier senior international competition. The scores had to be obtained at least 21 days before the first official practice day of the championships.

Number of entries per discipline
Based on the results of the 2016 World Championships, each ISU member nation was allowed to field one to three entries per discipline.

Entries 
Countries began publishing their selections as early as December 2016. The International Skating Union published a complete list on 9 March 2017.

Changes to initial assignments

Results

Men
Yuzuru Hanyu set a new world record for the free skating (223.20 points).

Ladies

Evgenia Medvedeva set a new world record for the free skating (154.40 points) and for the combined total (233.41 points).

Pairs

Ice dancing
Tessa Virtue and Scott Moir set a new world record for the short dance (82.43 points) and for the combined total (198.62 points). Gabriella Papadakis and Guillaume Cizeron set a new world record for the free dance (119.15 points).

Medals summary

Medalists
Medals for overall placement:

Small medals for placement in the short segment:

Small medals for placement in the free segment:

By country
Table of medals for overall placement:

Table of small medals for placement in the short segment:

Table of small medals for placement in the free segment:

References

External links 
 
 2017 World Championships at the International Skating Union
 http://www.isuresults.com/results/season1617/wc2017/index.htm

2017 in figure skating
2017 in Finnish sport
2017
International figure skating competitions hosted by Finland
Qualification tournaments for the 2018 Winter Olympics
2010s in Helsinki
March 2017 sports events in Europe
April 2017 sports events in Europe
International sports competitions in Helsinki